The 1963 Southwest Texas State Bobcats football team was an American football team that represented Southwest Texas State College (now known as Texas State University) during the 1963 NCAA College Division football season as a member of the Lone Star Conference (LSC). In their sixth year under head coach Milton Jowers, the team compiled an overall record of 10–0 with a mark of 7–0 in conference play.

Schedule

References

Southwest Texas State
Texas State Bobcats football seasons
Lone Star Conference football champion seasons
College football undefeated seasons
Southwest Texas State Bobcats football